Ishik or Ishik Alevism, also known as Chinarism, is a new syncretic religious movement among Alevis who have developed an alternative understanding of Alevism and its history. These alternative interpretations and beliefs were inspired by Turkish writer Erdoğan Çınar with the publication of his book Aleviliğin Gizli Tarihi (The Secret History of Alevism) in 2004.

Işık faith
While mainstream Alevis believe the term Alevi means  "follower of Ali", as in the Arabic word ‘Alawī, and consider themselves followers of the teachings and practices of 13th-century Alevi saint Haji Bektash Veli, Ishik believe differently. The Ishik movement claim that the term "Alevi" is derived from the old Anatolian Luvians, claiming that the word "Luvi" means "People of light" in the Hittite language. Some Ottoman documents from the 16th century refer to the ancestors of today's Alevis as "Işık Taifesi", meaning "People of Light". This is, according to Ishikīs, a proof of the connection between the Luvians and Alevis.

The Ishik Alevis have been likened to the Kurdish Yezidis, as part of a wider monotheistic tradition called Yazdanism.  A shared cultural history of that nature relates to common folklore describing the invention of agriculture by plant domestication.  Wheat is assumed to have been first cultured in the northern part of the Middle East; and likewise, regional peoples shared a culinary tradition in the types of vegetables they consume.

Self-image
Ishikīs consider themselves to be esotericists, claiming that Alevism is Esotericism itself, meaning that they identify themselves with every type of esotericism in history (e.g. Jewish esotericists, Christian esotericists, Islamic and Pagan esotericism etc.)

They claim that Alevism is the oldest religion in the world, that has changed shapes throughout time. This "First and True Religion" of the world, is claimed to have been the main source for all other religions and beliefs in the world:

The Ishikīs also claim that the religious ceremonies practiced by Alevis were practiced as early as by the Hittites and even by the Sumerians. According to Ishikīs, medieval Christian sects as Paulicianism, Bogomilism etc. were also Alevis. A good example of this belief can be found in the translation of the book The Cathars: The Most Successful Heresy of the Middle Ages (2005) by Sean Martin. Even though the original English version does not contain the word "Alevi", the Turkish translator has translated the title of the book as Ortaçağ'da Avrupa'da Alevi Hareketi – Katharlar (An Alevi Movement in The Middle Ages – The Cathars).

Historical beliefs
Compared to traditional Alevism, the most striking differences of the Ishik movement are their interpretation of history. The Ishik movement claims that Alevis have changed their apparent identity several times in history in order to survive. According to Ishikī belief, heretic sects like the Paulicians and Bogomils were actually Alevis compelled to appear as Christians because of the Byzantine oppression. Likewise the modern Alevis have gained an Islamic appearance because of the Ottoman oppression.

Ishikī thought is convinced that most heterodox groups are inventions as a result of oppression, meaning that groups like the Nizārī Ismā'īlī, Bektashism, Nusayrī Alawism, Ghulāt and Ahl-e Haqq are in reality separate from real Islam.

Criticism
The Ishikī versus Traditionalist split has caused a deep gap in Alevi society. This is the first time in centuries that Alevis have experienced such a great split in terms of beliefs.

 Traditionalist Alevis have strongly opposed the Ishikīs, who they consider are people who are creating a completely new religion, or sometimes as undercover agents, trying to disrupt Alevi unity. Ishikīs are also criticized for being extremely political and for abandoning fundamental Alevi sources, such as the Buyruks, one of the most known written source among Alevis.
 The Alevi historian, Hamza Aksüt, responded to the works of Erdoğan Çınar in several articles, criticizing him for being intentionally manipulative and highly conspirational. were officially given as a reply to the interview with Erdoğan Çınar: Çınar'dan uyarı: 'Her flörtün sonu evlilikle bitmez''' (Warning from Çınar: 'Not all flirts end with marriage'). Another writer, Ünsal Öztürk has also criticized Erdoğan Çınar. In 2010 Hamza Aksüt, Hasan Harmancı and Ünsal Öztürk went together in publishing the book Alevi Tarih Yazımında Skandal – Erdoğan Çınar Örneği (A Scandal in Alevi History Writing – The Erdoğan Çınar Example), which is an analysis and explaining of the claimed manipulation and "tampering" made by Erdoğan Çınar.
 Erdoğan Çınar received much criticism from Alevis and Alevi Dedes (for example Baki Güngör dede, who claim that Çınar's book is full of misconceptions and contradictions and consider it as yet another attempt of "Yol-Yezidiler" (enemies of the path of their tariqa) to assimilate the Alevis and to separate them from the mystic teachings of Haji Bektash Veli, Pir Sultan Abdal, Yunus Emre and The Twelve Imams.
 Some traditionalists have even gone so far as to demand that Ishikī dedes like Hasan Kılavuz should get the penalty of social exclusion.

Ishikī organizations
The Ishik movement has succeeded in becoming very influential in important and powerful Alevi organizations. The Alevi Confederation of Europe (AABK) for instance, has abandoned its traditional Alevi beliefs in 2006, which it replaced with a marginal Ishikī type of understanding.

See also
  
 Kızılbaşlar 
 Kurdish Alevism
 Yâresân
 Yazdânism
 Yezidism
 Zoroastrianism
 Zurvanism
 Luwian mythology
 Proto-Indo-Iranian religion
 Proto-Indo-European religion

References

Bibliography
 

 Further reading 
The primary sources of Ishikism are the works of the Turkish writer Erdoğan Çınar:

 "Secret History of Alawism", Aleviliğin Gizli Tarihi / Demirin Üstünde Karınca İzi (2004) "Lost One Thousand Years in Alawism", Aleviliğin Kayıp Bin Yılı (325–1325) Yolcu Ateşte Yanmak İle Yol Yanmaz (2006) "The Lost Alawi Legend", Kayıp Bir Alevi Efsanesi (2007) "The Roots of Alawism and the Esotericism of Abdal Musa", Aleviliğin Kökleri & Abdal Musa'nın Sırrı (2008)But he has also gained the support of other writers as well:
 Haşim Kutlu: Path of Qizilbash-Alawism,  Kızılbaş Alevilikte Yol Erkân Meydanı'', Yurt Kitap Yayın, 2007

Luwians
Alevism
Esotericism
Turkish culture
Religion in Turkey
Monotheistic religions